The 1939–40 season was Oldham Athletic's was the club's 45th season since forming in 1895. The team competed in Football League Third Division North. Following Britain's declaration of war on 3 September 1939, the league was abandoned after just three games and the results expunged from the records. For this reason, appearances made and goals scored in the Football League matches that were played do not contribute to a player's overall appearances and goals record.

Fixtures

Standings

See also
 Oldham Athletic A.F.C. seasons

External links
 Football League Division 3 (North) Table 1939/40

Oldham Athletic A.F.C. seasons
Oldham Athletic